Lusonectes (meaning "Portuguese swimmer") is an extinct genus of plesiosaurid from Lower Jurassic (Toarcian stage) deposits of Alhadas, Portugal. It is known from the holotype MG33, a partial skull and articulated mandible. It was found by Henri Émile Sauvage, a French paleontologist, in the 19th century from the São Gião Formation, near Murtede, Portugal. It was first named by Adam S. Smith, Ricardo Araújo and Octávio Mateus in 2012 and the type species is Lusonectes sauvagei. The generic name is derived from the prefix Luso meaning "Portuguese" and nectes ("swimmer" in Greek). The specific name honors Henri Émile Sauvage. It is based on a single autapomorphy, a broad triangular parasphenoid cultriform process that is as long as the posterior interpterygoid vacuities, and also on a unique character combination. Cladistic analysis of Jurassic plesiosauroids found Lusonectes to be "microcleidid elasmosaurs", equivalent to the clade Plesiosauridae after Ketchum and Benson, 2010. Lusonectes is the only diagnostic plesiosaur from Portugal to date.

See also

 List of plesiosaur genera
 Timeline of plesiosaur research

References

Early Jurassic plesiosaurs of Europe
Fossil taxa described in 2012
Taxa named by Octávio Mateus
Sauropterygian genera